Serafim Cojocari (born 7 January 2001) is a Moldovan professional footballer who plays as a midfielder for CSF Bălți, on loan from Sheriff Tiraspol.

Club career
Cojocari was born in Rezina and started his career with Zimbru Chișinău. He made his Moldovan National Division debut for the club on 4 August 2019 in a 3–0 loss against Sheriff Tiraspol. In March 2020, he signed a four-year contract with Sheriff Tiraspol, joining their reserve team. He made his first appearance for Sheriff's first team on 7 August 2021, coming on as a substitute in a 7–1 win against Dinamo-Auto.

On 1 September 2022, Cojocari joined CSF Bălți on a one-season loan.

International career
Cojocari has featured for Moldovan national youth teams at under-19 and under-21 level.

References

2001 births
Living people
People from Rezina District
Association football midfielders
Moldovan footballers
FC Zimbru Chișinău players
FC Sheriff Tiraspol players
CSF Bălți players
Moldovan Super Liga players
Moldova youth international footballers
Moldova under-21 international footballers